Flight 521 may refer to:

United Airlines Flight 521, air accident on May 29, 1947
Emirates Flight 521, air accident on August 3, 2016

0521